Madineh Qeshlaqi (also Romanized asMadīneh Qeshlāqī; also known as Askalū Moḩammad Ḩasanlū) is a village in Garamduz Rural District, Garamduz District, Khoda Afarin County, East Azerbaijan Province, Iran. At the 2006 census, its population was 144, in 26 families.

References 

Populated places in Khoda Afarin County